The Sports Hall of Fame of New Jersey was established in 1988 to honor athletes, teams, events and contributors associated with the state of New Jersey.  There is currently no physical site or structure for the hall, but its members are honored with plaques that are displayed at Meadowlands Arena, in the Meadowlands Sports Complex in East Rutherford.

The first group of members was inducted in May 1993. Inductees are honored in a public ceremony that takes place during New York Giants football games.

Inductees
See footnotes

Horace Ashenfelter (1998)
 Alvin Attles (1996)
 Rick Barry (1994)
 Bruce Baumgartner (2001)
 Yogi Berra (1993)
 Angelo Bertelli (2000)
 Joe Black (2001)
 Carol Blazejowski (1995)
 Al Blozis (2001)
 Bill Bradley (1993)
 Don Bragg (1999)
 Roosevelt Brown (1994)
 Frank R. Burns (2003)
 Dick Button (1995)
 Milt Campbell (1993)
 Pete Carril (1998)
 Harry Carson (1993)
 Dean Cetrulo (1996)
 Deron Cherry (1996)
 Leonard Coleman, Jr. (1998)
 Roger Cramer (2004)
 Lou Creekmur (1999)
 Wally Dallenbach (2004)
 Stanley Dancer (1995)
 Ray Dandridge (1996)
 Bob Davies (1997)
 Leon Day (1998)
 Al DeRogatis (1995)
 Larry Doby (1993)
 Anne Donovan (1998)
 Sid Dorfman (1998)
 Walter Dukes (2002) 
 Lou Duva (2003) 
 Althea Gibson (1994)
 John A. Gibson, Sr. (2002)
 Leon Goslin (1999)
 Roosevelt Grier (1997)
 Marvin Hagler (1996)
 Franco Harris (1993)
 Tom Heinsohn (1993)
 Leon Hess (1995)
 Robert Hurley (2000)
 Monte Irvin (1994)
 Jerry Izenberg (1997)
 Ron Johnson (1998)
 Dick Kazmaier (1997)
 Tom Kelly (2002)
 Lou Lamoriello (2002)
 Aubrey C. Lewis (2003)
 Carl Lewis (2001)
 Marty Liquori (1997)
 John Henry Lloyd (1998)
 Vince Lombardi (1993)
 Dick Lynch (2003)
 Wellington Mara (1995)
 George Martin (2004)
 Jack McKeon (2004)
 John McMullen (1996)
 Joe Medwick (1993)
 Debbie Meyer (1999)
 Sam Mills (2003)
 Steve Mizerak (2003)
 Robert E. Mulcahy III (1999)
 Renaldo Nehemiah (1999)
 Don Newcombe (2000)
 Bill Parcells (1997)
 Eulace Peacock (2000)
 Drew Pearson (2001)
 Pelé (1999)
 Johnny Petraglin (2002)
 Willis Reed (2000)
 Richard J. Regan (2001)
 Jim Ringo (1996)
 Phil Rizzuto (1993)
 Paul Robeson (1995)
 Frank B. Saul, Jr. (2004)
 Dave Sime (2004)
 Phil Simms (1999)
 William E. Simon (2004)
 Amos Alonzo Stagg (2001)
 Andy Stanfield (2002)
 David J. Stern (2000)
 Paul J. Tagliabue (2001)
 Lawrence Taylor (2000)
 Joe Theismann (1995)
 Bobby Thomson (2000)
 Frank Tripucka (1999)
 Jersey Joe Walcott (1994)
 Sonny Werblin (1997)
 Peter Westbrook (2002)
 Willie Wilson (2002) 
 Alex Wojciechowicz (1995)
 Lonnie Wright (2003)
 George B. Young (2003)
 Elaine Zayak (2004)

See also
New Jersey Hall of Fame (including sports inductees)
New Jersey Sports Writers Association Hall of Fame

References

External links
NJ GardenStatePreps.com (high school sports). Scout with FoxSports on MSN
New Jersey Chapter Hall of Fame (US Lacrosse). National Lacrosse Hall of Fame webpage. US Lacrosse website.

Halls of fame in New Jersey
New Jersey Sports
New J
Hall of Fame

Sports museums in New Jersey
Biographical museums in New Jersey
Museums in Bergen County, New Jersey
Awards established in 1988
1988 establishments in New Jersey